Donovan Woods may refer to:

 Donovan Woods (American football) (born 1985), American former football linebacker
 Donovan Woods (musician), Canadian folk and country singer-songwriter